Japanese Garden is a park and garden located in Jurong East, Singapore.

It is built on an artificial island in Jurong Lake and is connected to the adjacent Chinese Garden island by bridge named the Bridge of Double Beauty. Along with the aforementioned Chinese Garden, the two gardens are collectively known as the Jurong Gardens.

Layout and design
Where the Chinese Garden is designed to be visually exciting, the Japanese Gardens are designed with a calmness to evoke inner peace and a meditative state. The styles and methods used for designing the garden are taken from Japan's Muromachi period of 1392 to 1568 and the Azuchi–Momoyama period of 1568 to 1615.

With its traditional arched bridges, 10 odd Tōrō stone lanterns, traditional house and rest house, ponds and gravel chipped pavings it faithfully recreates the traditional Japanese style.

Interests
On the grounds is also a Turtle & Tortoise Museum as well as one of 10 sundials placed around Singapore to promote the interest in science. The one in the Japanese Garden represents the planet Venus (while the one in the Chinese Garden is for 'Earth'). Large monitor lizards can be seen roaming in the area of the koi filled ponds.

Cultural festivals such as Chinese New Year (usually January/February) and the Mid-Autumn Festival (September/October) are the best times to visit the gardens.

See also
 Geography of Singapore
 Japan–Singapore relations

References

External links

Official website of the Jurong Lake Gardens

Parks in Singapore
Tourist attractions in Singapore
Jurong East
Japanese diaspora in Singapore
Japanese gardens